The Nikon Coolpix series are digital compact cameras in many variants produced by Nikon. It includes superzoom, bridge, travel-zoom, miniature compact and waterproof/rugged cameras.

Current models
Nikon Coolpix cameras are organized into five different lines. The line in which a particular camera is placed is indicated by the letter which is the first character of its model number.  The lines are: the (A) series, the (AW) all weather series, the (L) life series, the (P) performance series, and the (S) style series.

A Series
The Coolpix A Series is Nikon's new flagship point and shoot camera.

All Weather Series

W Series

B Series

Life Series

Performance Series

Style Series

Discontinued models

Life Series

Performance Series

Style Series

Coolpix xxx

Coolpix 2xxx

Coolpix 3xxx

Coolpix 4xxx

Coolpix 5xxx
Note some cameras are numbered 5xxx on front, and E5xxx on bottom.

Coolpix 7xxx

Coolpix 8xxx

Raw image format
The following Coolpix cameras support raw image files: 
 5000 (discontinued) - NEF format
 8700 (discontinued) - NEF format (with firmware upgrade)
 P6000 (discontinued) – NRW format
 P7000 (discontinued), P7100 – NRW format

Some Coolpix cameras which are not advertised as supporting a raw file format can produce usable raw files if switched to a maintenance mode.  Note that switching to this mode can invalidate a camera's guarantee. Nikon models with this capability: E700, E800, E880, E900, E950, E990, E995, E2100, E2500, E3700, E4300, E4500.

References

External links 

 Imaging Products | Compact Digital Cameras by Nikon
 Compact Digital Cameras by Nikon | Point and Shoot Cameras
 Coolpix Cameras

 
Electronics lists